Semiahmoo Secondary School is a public high school in South Surrey, British Columbia, and is part of School District 36 Surrey. Founded in 1940 as the first senior secondary school in South Surrey, Semiahmoo spans grades eight through twelve. The school currently has a student population of around 1700 and a faculty of 96, and is headed by Bal Ranu.

Semiahmoo is one of four public high schools on the peninsula, along with Earl Marriott Secondary School, Elgin Park Secondary School and Grandview Heights Secondary School.

History 
Semiahmoo Secondary was built in the city of White Rock in the late 1930s, becoming the area's first secondary school. The former building, now cleared, stood where White Rock Elementary School stands today. When White Rock Junior Secondary was built in 1961 on Oxford Street, Semiahmoo was officially renamed Semiahmoo Senior Secondary. A severe classroom shortage in the 1980s, started by a fire in White Rock Junior Secondary, prompted an effort by the provincial ministry of education to expand educational facilities in South Surrey. In 1989, Semiahmoo was transferred to the newly renovated and expanded White Rock Junior facilities, officially becoming Semiahmoo Secondary School.

Academics
International Baccalaureate (IB)

Semiahmoo Secondary School has been an IB World School since June 1980. Surrey students are permitted to cross school boundaries to enter the International Baccalaureate Diploma. Approximately 300 students in Grades 11 & 12 are enrolled in the IB Program at Semiahmoo. There is also the option of students enrolling in the Partial IB Program. Students apply to the program in the Grade 10 year by sending in the completed application package which can be found on the school website.

Extracurricular activities

Music

Almost all of Semiahmoo's instrumental music ensembles are full courses in the school timetable. The program consists of 3 concert bands: grade 8, grade 9, and Senior Wind Ensemble (grade 10-12); 6 jazz bands: grade 8, two grade 9, grade 10, grade 11, and grade 12; and varying amounts of jazz combos per year. 
The current head of the department is Dagan Lowe along with two other directors Sarah Kennedy (s. 2016) and Jeff Williams (s. 2019).

Theatre
Semiahmoo houses a theatre that can hold approximately 200 people. In addition, the senior grades perform various one-act plays, Shakespearean works, and improvisation sessions throughout the year.

Athletics
Semiahmoo has received multiple Provincial banners in recent years. Semiahmoo has a track, baseball field, all weather soccer fields and a rugby field. There is also a beach volleyball court. Semiahmoo Secondary is known for their prestigious basketball team.

Notable alumni
Paul Campbell, actor, Battlestar Galactica
Jonathan Groenheyde, professional ice hockey goaltender
Colton Gillies, left winger for the Columbus Blue Jackets
Ardo Hansson, World Bank economist and Governor of the Bank of Estonia
Gordie Hogg, politician
Robert Langlands, mathematician, founder of the Langlands program
Grant Lawrence, CBC Radio 3 host
Gabrielle Miller, actress, Corner Gas and Robson Arms
Nardwuar the Human Serviette, journalist
A.C. Newman, songwriter, leader of The New Pornographers
Hannah Simone, former fashion model, actress, "New Girl", MuchMusic VJ
Richard Weinberger, Olympic swimmer, bronze medalist
Sean Whyte, CFL player, Edmonton Eskimos, and Lew Hayman Trophy winner

Covid-19 
As of November 28, 2020 There have been numerous cases of Covid-19 in the school

Gallery

References

External links

 School Performance

International Baccalaureate schools in British Columbia
High schools in Surrey, British Columbia
Educational institutions established in 1940
1940 establishments in British Columbia
High schools in British Columbia